The Silver Logie for Most Outstanding Children's Program is an award presented annually at the Australian TV Week Logie Awards. It was first awarded at the 42nd Annual TV Week Logie Awards in 2000, and is given to honour an outstanding Australian children's television program. The winner and nominees of this award are chosen by television industry juries. Hi-5, Round the Twist, My Place, Dance Academy, Nowhere Boys and Bluey  hold the record for the most wins, with two each.

Winners and nominees

Multiple wins/nominations

References

External links

Awards established in 2000

Children's television awards